This is a list of alleged sightings of unidentified flying objects or UFOs in the Canary Islands.

1974 - 24 November 1974 

1976 - 22 June 1976.
This reported UFO sighting occurred over the Canary Islands on 22 June 1976. It is notable for its duration (over 40 minutes), multiple locations (it was observed in Tenerife, La Palma, La Gomera, Gran Canaria and by a ship at sea) and multiple witnesses (several hundred people, including both civilian and military personnel). It is one of the few accounts to include a report from two witnesses detailing occupants inside a craft - although this is considered dubious by Antonio Munaiz military judge who wrote the Spanish government report and interviewed the witnesses and also by Carlos Dolz de Espejo the lieutenant general of the Air Force at the time who appointed him. The official report on the incident, by the Spanish Air Force, was declassified in June 1994. Much of its content had already been released to the public in 1977, after journalist and paranormal investigator J.J. Benitez obtained the same report and used it as the basis of a book on UFO cases.

1976 - 19 November 1976 

1979 - 5 March 1979

See also 
 List of major UFO sightings

References

External links 
 MUFON - Last 20 UFO Sightings and Pictures

Canary Islands
Historical events in Spain
UFO sightings
Events in the Canary Islands